The United States Golf Association (USGA) is the United States national association of golf courses, clubs and facilities and the governing body of golf for the U.S. and Mexico. Together with The R&A, the USGA produces and interprets the rules of golf. The USGA also provides a national handicap system for golfers, conducts 14 national championships, including the U.S. Open, U.S. Women's Open and U.S. Senior Open, and tests golf equipment for conformity with regulations. The USGA and the USGA Museum are located in Liberty Corner, New Jersey.

History
The USGA was originally formed in 1894 to resolve the question of a national amateur championship.  Earlier that year, the Newport Country Club and Saint Andrew's Golf Club, Yonkers, New York, both declared the winners of their tournaments the "national amateur champion." That autumn, delegates from Newport, St. Andrew's, The Country Club, Chicago Golf Club, and Shinnecock Hills Golf Club met in New York City to form a national governing body, which would administer the championship and also the Rules of Golf for the country.  On December 22, 1894, the Amateur Golf Association of the United States was officially formed, and was shortly thereafter renamed the "United States Golf Association". Theodore Havemeyer was the first president, and the U.S. Amateur trophy is named in his honor.

The first U.S. Amateur was held in 1895 at the Newport Country Club, with Charles B. Macdonald (who was runner-up at both of the previous year's tournaments) winning the championship.  The first U.S. Open was held the following day, almost as an afterthought. It was not until 1898 that the two events were held at separate clubs. Today, the USGA administers 14 separate national championships, ten of which are expressly for amateurs.

The USGA gradually expanded its membership from the original five clubs. There were 267 club members in 1910, and 1,138 clubs by 1932. Membership fell off during the Great Depression and World War II, but recovered by 1947. By 1980 there were over 5,000 clubs, and today membership exceeds 9,700.

On September 17, 1956, Ann Gregory began competing in the U.S. Women's Amateur Championship, thus becoming the first African-American woman to play in a national championship conducted by the USGA.

Competitions organized by the USGA

The USGA organizes or co-organizes the following competitions:

Open championships
An "open" golf championship is one that both professionals and amateurs may enter. In practice, such events are always won by professionals nowadays. The two leading opens in the U.S. are:

 U.S. Open – no age or gender restrictions, Handicap Index requirement of 1.4 or less. Established in 1895, it is the second-oldest of the four major championships.
 U.S. Women's Open – females, no age restrictions, Handicap Index requirement of 2.4 or less. Established in 1946 and administered by the USGA since 1953, it is the oldest of the five women's majors.

The USGA also conducts the U.S. Senior Open for competitors 50 and over. This is one of the five majors recognized by the world's dominant tour for golfers 50 and over, PGA Tour Champions. The overwhelming majority of the competitors play regularly on this tour. Many of the remaining players compete on the European counterpart of PGA Tour Champions, the European Senior Tour, which recognizes the U.S. Senior Open as one of its three majors.  The USGA added a women's counterpart in 2018.

 U.S. Senior Open – no gender restriction, players age 50 & older, handicap index requirement of 3.4 or less, established in 1980.
 U.S. Senior Women's Open – women's players age 50 & older with a handicap index of 7.4 or less, established in 2018.

Individual amateur championships
Professional golf in the US is mainly run by the PGA Tour, the LPGA, and the PGA of America.  However, the USGA organizes the 10 national amateur championships. The leading events are open to all age groups, but are usually won by golfers in their early twenties:

 U.S. Amateur – no age or gender restrictions, handicap index of 2.4 or less, established in 1895.
 U.S. Women's Amateur – no age restrictions, females with a handicap index of 5.4 or less, established in 1895.

There are two championships for players under age 19:

 U.S. Girls' Junior – girls with a handicap index of 9.4 or less, established in 1949
 U.S. Junior Amateur – no gender restriction, handicap index of 4.4 or less, established in 1948

And two for senior golfers:

 U.S. Senior Amateur – no gender restriction, players age 55 & older, handicap index of 7.4 or less, established in 1955
 U.S. Senior Women's Amateur – women age 50 & older with a handicap index of 18.4 or less, established in 1962

Because the U.S. Amateur and U.S. Women's Amateur became increasingly  dominated by future tournament professionals, two national championships were added in the 1980s for "career amateurs" who were 25 years of age & older:

 U.S. Mid-Amateur – no gender restriction, players age 25 & older, handicap index of 3.4 or less, established in 1981
 U.S. Women's Mid-Amateur – women age 25 & older with a handicap index of 9.4 or less, established in 1987

Team amateur championships
These team events were announced by the USGA in 2013 as the replacements for the discontinued Public Links championships and played for the first time in 2015. Both are contested by two-member teams in four-ball matches. Partners are not required to be from the same club, political subdivision, or country.
 U.S. Amateur Four-Ball – no age or gender restrictions; handicap index of 5.4 or less
 U.S. Women's Amateur Four-Ball – no age restrictions, females with a handicap index of 14.4 or less

State team championships
The USGA men's and women's state team championships were first conducted in 1995 as a part of the USGA's Centennial celebration.  The two championships were conducted biennially in odd-numbered years through 2009.  Since 2010, the men's championship has been conducted in even-numbered years and the women's championship in odd-numbered years. According to NCAA rules, college golfers are not eligible.

USGA Men's State Team Championship
USGA Women's State Team Championship

International team competitions
The USGA, in cooperation with The R&A, co-organizes two biennial amateur team competitions between the United States and a joint team representing Great Britain and Ireland (in political terms, Ireland and the United Kingdom).

Curtis Cup – 8-woman teams, played in even-numbered years. The 2018 edition was the first in which The R&A was directly involved. Previously, the Ladies' Golf Union was the co-organizer, but that body merged with The R&A in late 2016 (after that year's Curtis Cup had been played).
Walker Cup – 10-man male teams, played in odd-numbered years.

Through its membership of the International Golf Federation the USGA is involved in the administration of the two "World Amateur Team Championships", which are played biennially in even-numbered years.

Eisenhower Trophy – for men
Espirito Santo Trophy – for women

Discontinued championships
There had been two events for "public-course" golfers, but the USGA announced in 2013 that both would be discontinued after their 2014 editions. Members of private golf clubs were excluded from these championships.

 U.S. Amateur Public Links – popularly known as the "Publinx"; no gender restriction, handicap index of 4.4 or less, established in 1922 and discontinued in 2014
 U.S. Women's Amateur Public Links – popularly known as the "Women's Publinx"; women with a handicap index of 18.4 or less, established in 1977 and discontinued in 2014

Multiple event winners
Only eight golfers have won more than one USGA individual event in the same year:
 Chick Evans won the U.S. Open and U.S. Amateur in 1916. He went on to win the U.S. Amateur in 1920.
 Bobby Jones won the U.S. Open and U.S. Amateur as half of his historic Grand Slam in 1930. Jones had previously won three U.S. Opens (1923, 1926, 1929) and four U.S. Amateurs (1924, 1925, 1927, 1928).
 Jay Sigel won the U.S. Amateur and U.S. Mid-Amateur in 1983. He had won the U.S. Amateur in 1982 and would win the Mid-Am in 1985 and 1987.
 Pearl Sinn won the Women's Public Links and Women's Amateur in 1988. She successfully defended her Women's Publinx title in 1989.
 Ryan Moore won the U.S. Public Links and U.S. Amateur in 2004. He had previously won the Publinx in 2002.
 Colt Knost won the U.S. Public Links and U.S. Amateur in 2007.
 Jennifer Song won the Women's Public Links and Women's Amateur in 2009.
 Seong Eun-jeong won the Girls' Junior and Women's Amateur in 2016. She had previously won the Girls' Junior in 2015.

Six people have won three different USGA individual events in their careers:
 JoAnne Carner (née Gunderson) – Girls' Jr – 1956; Women's Am – 1957, 1960, 1962, 1966, 1968; Women's Open – 1971, 1976
 Arnold Palmer – Amat – 1954; Open – 1960; Sr Open – 1981
 Jack Nicklaus – Amat – 1959, 1961; Open – 1962, 1967, 1972, 1980; Sr Open – 1991, 1993
 Carol Semple Thompson – Women's Am – 1973; Women's Mid-Am – 1990, 1997; Sr Women's Am – 1999, 2000, 2001, 2002
 Tiger Woods – Jr Amat – 1991, 1992, 1993; Amat – 1994, 1995, 1996; Open – 2000, 2002, 2008
 Jill McGill – Women's Am – 1993; Women's Publinx – 1994; Sr Women's Open – 2022

Fifty other people have won two different USGA individual events in their careers, and two have won USGA individual and team events:
 Francis Ouimet – Open – 1913; Amat – 1914, 1931
 Jerome Travers – Amat – 1907, 1908, 1912, 1913; Open – 1915
 Johnny Goodman – Open – 1933; Amat – 1937
 Lawson Little – Amat – 1934, 1935; Open – 1940
 Patty Berg – Women's Am – 1938; Women's Open – 1946
 Betty Jameson – Women's Am – 1939, 1940; Women's Open – 1947
 Babe Zaharias – Women's Am – 1946; Women's Open – 1948, 1950, 1954
 Louise Suggs – Women's Am – 1947; Women's Open – 1949, 1952
 Mickey Wright – Girls' Jr – 1952; Women's Open – 1958, 1959, 1961, 1964
 Gene Littler – Amat – 1953; Open – 1961
 Catherine Lacoste – Women's Open – 1967; Women's Am – 1969
 Gene Andrews – Publinx – 1954; Sr Amat – 1970
 Johnny Miller – Jr Amat – 1964; Open – 1973
 Jerry Pate – Amat – 1974; Open – 1976
 Dorothy Germain Porter – Women's Am – 1949; Sr Women's Am – 1977, 1980, 1981, 1983
 Hollis Stacy – Girls' Jr – 1969, 1970, 1971; Women's Open – 1977, 1978, 1984
 William C. Campbell – Amat – 1964; Sr Amat – 1979, 1980
 Lori Castillo – Girls' Jr – 1978; Women's Publinx – 1979, 1980
 Amy Alcott – Girls' Jr – 1973; Women's Open – 1980
 Billy Casper – Open – 1959, 1966; Sr Open – 1983
 Heather Farr – Girls' Jr – 1982; Women's Publinx – 1984
 Marlene Streit (née Stewart) – Women's Am – 1956; Sr Women's Am – 1985, 1994, 2003
 Billy Mayfair – Publinx – 1986; Amat – 1987
 Gary Player – Open – 1965; Sr Open – 1987, 1988
 Anne Quast (aka Decker, Welts, Sander) – Women's Am – 1958, 1961, 1963; Women's Mid-Am – 1987, 1989, 1990, 1993
 Orville Moody – Open – 1969; Sr Open – 1989
 Pat Hurst – Girls' Jr – 1986; Women's Am – 1990
 Lee Trevino – Open – 1968, 1971; Sr Open – 1990
 Amy Fruhwirth – Women's Am – 1991; Women's Publinx – 1992
 Kelli Kuehne – Girls' Jr – 1994; Women's Am – 1995, 1996
 Dorothy Delasin – Girls' Jr – 1996; Women's Am – 1998
 Hale Irwin – Open – 1974, 1979, 1990; Sr Open – 1998, 2000
 Juli Inkster – Women's Am – 1980, 1981, 1982; Women's Open – 1999, 2002
 Bruce Fleisher – Amat – 1968; Sr Open – 2001
 Inbee Park – Girls' Jr – 2002; Women's Open – 2008, 2013
 Vinny Giles – Amat – 1972; Sr Amat – 2009
 Ellen Port – Women's Mid-Am – 1995, 1996, 2000, 2011; Sr. Women's Am – 2012, 2013, 2016
 Michelle Wie – Women's Publinx – 2003; Women's Open – 2014
 Joan Higgins – Women's Mid-Am – 2008; Sr. Women's Am – 2014
 Nathan Smith – Mid-Am – 2003, 2009, 2010, 2012; Four-Ball – 2015
 Jordan Spieth – Jr Amat – 2009, 2011; Open – 2015 
 Ariya Jutanugarn – Girls' Jr – 2011; Women's Open – 2018
 Laura Davies – Women's Open – 1987; Sr. Women's Open – 2018
 Scott Harvey – Mid-Am – 2014; Four-Ball – 2019
 Bryson DeChambeau – Amat – 2015; Open – 2020
 Jim Furyk – Open – 2003; Sr Open – 2021 
 Rose Zhang – Women's Am – 2020; Girls' Jr – 2021
 Annika Sörenstam – Women's Open – 1995, 1996, 2006; Sr. Women's Open – 2021
 Minjee Lee – Girls' Jr – 2012; Women's Open – 2022
 Matt Fitzpatrick – Amat – 2013; Open – 2022 

Note: Multiple winners of individual events can be found in that event's article.

Most career USGA championships won
 Bobby Jones: 9 – Open - 1923, 1926, 1929, 1930; Amat - 1924, 1925, 1927, 1928, 1930
 Tiger Woods: 9 – Jr Amat - 1991, 1992, 1993; Amat - 1994, 1995, 1996; Open - 2000, 2002, 2008
 JoAnne Carner: 8 – Girls' Jr - 1956; Women's Am - 1957, 1960, 1962, 1966, 1968; Women's Op - 1971, 1976
 Jack Nicklaus: 8 – Amat - 1959, 1961; Open - 1962, 1967, 1972, 1980; Sr Open - 1991, 1993
 Anne Quast (aka Decker, Welts, Sander): 7 – Women's Am - 1958, 1961, 1963; Sr Women's Am - 1987, 1990, 1992, 1993
 Ellen Port: 7 – Women's Mid-Am - 1995, 1996, 2000, 2011; Sr. Women's Am - 2012, 2013, 2016
 Carol Semple Thompson: 7 – Women's Am - 1973; Women's Mid-Am - 1990, 1997; Sr Women's Am - 1999, 2000, 2001, 2002
 Glenna Collett (Vare): 6 – Women's Am - 1922, 1925, 1928, 1929, 1930, 1935
 Hollis Stacy: 6 – Girls' Jr - 1969, 1970, 1971; Women's Open - 1977, 1978, 1984
 Jerome Travers: 5 – Amat - 1907, 1908, 1912, 1913; Open - 1915
 Mickey Wright: 5 – Girls' Jr - 1952; Women's Op - 1958, 1959, 1961, 1964
 Carolyn Cudone: 5 – Sr Women's Am - 1968-1972
 Dorothy Germain Porter: 5 – Women's Am - 1949; Sr. Women's Am - 1977, 1980, 1981, 1983
 Jay Sigel: 5 – Amat - 1982, 1983; Mid-Am - 1983, 1985, 1987
 Hale Irwin: 5 – Open - 1974, 1979, 1990; Sr Open 1998, 2000
 Juli Inkster: 5 – Women's Am - 1980, 1981, 1982; Women's Open - 1999, 2002
 Nathan Smith: 5 – Mid-Am – 2003, 2009, 2010, 2012; Four-Ball – 2015

Virtual USGA Championship
The  USGA  partnered with World Golf Tour in 2009 to co-host the first annual Virtual USGA Championship online. The Virtual U.S. Open attracted hundreds of thousands of players from more than 180 countries.  The first-place winner took home a replica of the U.S. Open trophy and won a trip for two to Pebble Beach for the next year's event.

See also
 American Junior Golf Association
 George Herbert Walker, past president and namesake of the Walker Cup
 Golf in the United States
 United States Golf Association Museum and Arnold Palmer Center for Golf History

References

External links
Database of all USGA Championships results

National members of the Americas Golf Association
Golf in the United States
Golf associations
Golf
Bernards Township, New Jersey
1894 establishments in the United States
Sports organizations established in 1894